MTV Music is a British pay television channel operated by Paramount Networks UK & Australia. The brand was first launched in the UK and Ireland before launching in Australia, New Zealand, Italy, the Netherlands and Poland. Unlike other MTV Music channels, this channel offers subtitles on selected programmes.

History
Viacom International Media Network announced the introduction of a non-stop music channel in January 2011. As the main MTV brand has deviated from its original purpose and increased competition from other music channels and online services, MTV addressed this issue by launching a new music channel MTV Music. The channel launched on 1 February 2011 in both the United Kingdom and Ireland. The channel replaced MTV Shows.

On the 1 February 2011, on Sky UK and Sky Ireland, MTV and MTV Shows swapped positions in the EPG where MTV became part of the Entertainment channels and MTV Shows was moved to the Music channels and renamed MTV Music. MTV Shows programming was transferred to MTV, while MTV Music was dedicated to playing music videos, similarly like its sister channels MTV Base, MTV Classic, MTV Dance, MTV Hits, MTV Rocks and MTV Live.

MTV Music began broadcasting in widescreen in the UK & Ireland on 28 March 2012. On 15 February 2016, MTV Music +1 launched in the UK on Sky channel 358, replacing the standard-definition version of MTV Live HD. Following the closures of MTV OMG, MTV Rocks and Club MTV on 20 July 2020, MTV Music broadcasts a weekly chart based on MTV Rocks programming on Sundays. The timeshift channel also closed as part of this change, along with the timeshifts for MTV and Comedy Central Extra.

On 8 September 2022 at 22:00 BST, MTV Music (alongside with MTV Hits, MTV 80s, MTV 90s in the United Kingdom/Ireland and MTV Live in Europe, MENA, Latin America, and Asia) temporarily suspended its regularly scheduled programming, due to the death of Queen Elizabeth II. As a result of the suspension of regular programming on all of MTV's music channels in the United Kingdom, two music video programmes were created in order to fill the gap, one being "Programming Pause" (which it was broadcast from 8 September 2022 at 22:55 until 10 September 2022 at 06:00 BST) and the other being "Nothing but Music" (which it was broadcast from 10 September 2022 at 06:00 BST until 13 September 2022 at 06:00 BST). Both of these programmes played laid back and sombre music videos. Regular programming for all of MTV's music channels in the United Kingdom/Ireland were resumed on 13 September 2022 at 06:00 BST, while MTV Live resumed its regularly scheduled programing 4 hours earlier at 02:00 BST.

On 19 September 2022, all of MTV's music channels in the United Kingdom/Ireland temporarily suspended its regularly scheduled programming (including teleshopping programmes) and it was replaced with the music programme "Nothing but Music" (also known "Nothing but Hits" on MTV Hits, "Nothing but 80s" on MTV 80s and "Nothing but 90s" on MTV 90s) on that day, due to the state funeral of Queen Elizabeth II.

Programming

Current Programming 
 Artist & Friends
 Artist x Artist x Artist
 Artist x2
 Artist: Brand New Vid!
 Artist: Certified Platinum
 Artist: Official Top 10
 Artist: Official Top 20
 Artist: Rocks 5!
 Artist: Rocks 10!
 Artist: Rocks Special
 About Damn Time To Party!
 Club MTV's Big 20
 Gonzo
 I Want My MTV: ...
 Loudest Rock Anthems!
 Make Me Feel Good Party Anthems!
 MTV Asks
 MTV Essentials
 MTV Live
 MTV Unplugged
 MTV World Stage
 Rap & R&B Right Now!
 The Official Chart Update Top 10
 The Official Top 50 Singles of The Year So Far!
 The Official UK Streaming Chart
 The Official UK Top 20
 The Official UK Top 40
 Ultimate 20 Cover Versions
 Viral Vids Right Now!
 Weekly Mix!
 We Love: Artist
 Yo! MTV Raps: The Playlist - airs also on MTV Germany next year

Live Events 

 MTV Europe Music Awards
 MTV Video Music Awards

Regional channels

Pan-European

A pan-European version of the channel. The channel consisted of non-stop music videos 24-hours a day. The channel ceased broadcasting in June 2021. The channel is registered with the broadcasting regulator RRTV in the Czech Republic. This channel is available in Austria, Croatia, Denmark, Finland, Germany, Hungary, Israel, Latvia, Lithuania, Luxembourg, Malta, Netherlands, Norway, Poland, Portugal, Slovenia, Spain, Sweden, Switzerland and South Africa. Previously, MTV Music UK was made available across Europe.

Ireland
MTV Music Ireland launched on 31 October 2013. It was a simultaneous broadcast of the UK version with Irish local advertising/sponsorship MTV Music Ireland ceased broadcasting from 31 May 2019 and the channel was replaced with the UK version.

Italy

MTV Music channel launched in Italy on 1 March 2011, replacing MTV Plus.

Australia and New Zealand

On 3 December 2013 VIMN launched the channel in Australia replacing MTV Hits. 
On 1 December 2015, MTV Music launched in New Zealand on Sky Television, replacing both MTV Hits &  MTV Classic. The channel was closed on 1 July 2020 and replaced by MTV Hits Australia & New Zealand.

Poland

MTV Music launched in Poland on 17 October 2017, replacing VIVA Poland after 17 years of broadcasting. MTV Music closed in Poland on 3 March 2020 and was replaced by MTV Music 24.

Logos

External links
TV Guide
MTV Music Playlist
MTV Music UK & Ireland - presentation, screenshots

References

MTV channels
Music video networks in the United Kingdom
Television channels and stations established in 2011